Janvier 194 is an Indian reserve of the Chipewyan Prairie First Nation in Alberta, Canada that is surrounded by the Regional Municipality of Wood Buffalo.

Geography 
The locality of Janvier is on the Janvier 194 reserve.

Demographics 
In the 2016 Canadian Census, it recorded a population of 414 living in 126 of its 143 total private dwellings.

References

Regional Municipality of Wood Buffalo
Indian reserves in Alberta